Frustration is a solitaire game with roots in the 1700s, and is similar to but opposite of Hit or Miss. It relies purely on luck rather than on skill, and has been both mathematically analyzed and discussed in popular media.
This is an example of a derangement problem in combinatorial mathematics, which can be understood using a combinatorial tool called a rook polynomial.
The probability of winning the game has been determined exactly, and is approximately 1.6233%.
The same technique can be applied to variations of the game that use different numbers of suits, and different numbers of cards per suit.

Rules
As in the Hit or Miss, the player deals the cards, and says "ace" when drawing the first card, "two" for the second, then "three, four... nine, ten, jack, queen, king" then starts again with "ace".

The game is lost if the rank of a dealt card matches the rank uttered by the player while dealing it.  The game is won if the sequence is successfully repeated four times (and the entire deck is thus dealt out) without any word/card match causing a loss.

See also
 Hit or Miss
 List of solitaires
 Glossary of solitaire

References

External links 
 Estimating the probability of winning Frustration Solitaire by simulating 100,000 games in Mathematica

Single-deck patience card games
Pocket patience card games